The Jennie Bramhall House is a historic house located in northeast Portland, Oregon, United States. It is significant for its highly unusual combination of Queen Anne styling with cast concrete block construction. Built in 1908–1909, it is one of the finest remaining Queen Anne houses in the Albina district, and one of only a few cast concrete houses in that area.

It was listed on the National Register of Historic Places in 1999.

See also
 National Register of Historic Places listings in Northeast Portland, Oregon

References

External links
 

1909 establishments in Oregon
Houses completed in 1909
Houses on the National Register of Historic Places in Portland, Oregon
King, Portland, Oregon
Queen Anne architecture in Oregon
Portland Historic Landmarks